The Makarska International Championships is a WTA 125-level professional women's tennis tournament. It takes place on outdoor clay courts, during the second week of French Open at the Tennis Center Makarska in the city of Makarska, Croatia. The tournament was held in 1998 as WTA Tier IV level event. In 2022, the tournament made a comeback as a WTA 125 level event as a replacement for the Bol Open.

Results

Singles

Doubles

See also
 Bol Open
 Croatia Open Umag

References

External links
 Tournament finals 2006-1971
 Official website

 
Tennis tournaments in Croatia
Clay court tennis tournaments
WTA 125 tournaments
WTA Tour
Annual events in Croatia